Tritonia challengeriana is a species of dendronotid nudibranch. It is a marine gastropod mollusc in the family Tritoniidae.

References

External links 
 photo at Slug Site, Michael Miller
 Tritonia antarctica has a factsheet under its "antarctica" name at Sea Slug Forum

Tritoniidae
Gastropods described in 1884